is a city located in the western portion of Tokyo Metropolis, Japan. , the city had an estimated population of 561,344, and a population density of 3000 persons per km2.

Geography

Hachiōji is located in the foothills of the Okutama Mountains of western Tokyo, about 40 kilometers west of the center of the 23 special wards of Tokyo.  The city is surrounded on three sides by mountains, forming the Hachioji Basin which opens up toward the east in the direction of Tokyo. The mountain ranges in the southwest include Mount Takao (599 m) and Mount Jinba (857 m), two popular hiking destinations which can be reached by train and bus, respectively.

Surrounding municipalities
Tokyo Metropolis
Machida
Tama
Fussa
Hino
Akishima
Akiruno
Hinohara
Kanagawa Prefecture
Sagamihara

Climate
Hachiōji has a Humid subtropical climate (Köppen Cfa) characterized by warm summers and cool winters with light to no snowfall.  The average annual temperature in Hachiōji is 13.9 °C. The average annual rainfall is 1998 mm with September as the wettest month. The temperatures are highest on average in August, at around 25.3 °C, and lowest in January, at around 2.4 °C.

Demographics
Per Japanese census data, the population of Hachiōji has recently plateaued after nine decades of strong growth.

History
The area of present-day Hachiōji was part of ancient Musashi Province. It has been an important junction point and post town along the Kōshū Kaidō, the main road that connected the historical Edo (today's Tokyo) with western Japan. Hachiōji Castle was built during the Sengoku period in 1584 by Hōjō Ujiteru, but was destroyed in 1590 by Toyotomi Hideyoshi. During the Edo period, the area was tenryō controlled directly by the Tokugawa shogunate. In the post-Meiji Restoration cadastral reform of July 22, 1878, the area became part of Minamitama District in Kanagawa Prefecture. The town of Hachiōji was created on April 1, 1889, with the establishment of the modern municipalities system. Minaitama District was transferred to the administrative control of Tokyo Metropolis on April 1, 1893. Hachiōji gained city status on September 1, 1917.

During the 1964 Summer Olympics, the city played host to the road cycling events. A velodrome in the city played host to the track cycling events.

Hachiōji became a Core city on April 1, 2015 with increased local autonomy.

Government
Hachiōji has a mayor-council form of government with a directly elected mayor and a unicameral city council of 40 members, whose members are elected for a four-year term. Hachiōji contributes five members to the Tokyo Metropolitan Assembly. In terms of national politics, the city is divided between the Tokyo 21st district and Tokyo 24th district of the lower house of the Diet of Japan.

Mayors of Hachiōji (1917–present)

Economy
During the Meiji period, Hachiōji prospered as an important location for the production of silk and silk textiles. The industry faded away, however, in the 1960s. Today, Hachiōji mainly serves as a commuter town for people working in Tokyo, and as a location for many large colleges and universities.

Education

Colleges and universities 
Chuo University (Tama Campus)
Digital Hollywood University
Kogakuin University (Hachioji Campus)
Kyorin University (Hachioji Campus)
Meisei University (Hino Campus)
Nihon Bunka University
Soka University
Tama Art University (Hachioji Campus)
Takushoku University (Hachioji Campus)
Teikyo University (Hachioji Campus)
Tokyo Junshin University
Tokyo Kasei-Gakuin University (Machida Campus)
Tokyo Metropolitan University (Minamiōsawa Campus)
Tokyo University of Agriculture and Technology
Tokyo University of Pharmacy and Life Sciences
Tokyo University of Technology (Hachiōji Campus)
Tokyo Zokei University
Nippon Engineering College

Primary and secondary education
The Tokyo Metropolitan Government Board of Education operates nine public high schools, and the metropolis also operates the Hachioji School for the Blind. There are also eleven private high schools.

Metropolitan high schools:

  (junior and senior high)
 
 
 
 
 
 
 
 

Hachiōji has 70 public elementary schools and 37 public junior high schools operated by the city government, as well as four public combined elementary/junior high schools.

Combined public elementary and junior high schools:
 Izumi no Mori School (いずみの森義務教育学校)
 Tate (館小中学校)

Municipal junior high schools:

 No. 1 (第一中学校)
 No. 2 (第二中学校)
 No. 4 (第四中学校)
 No. 6 (第六中学校)
 No. 7 (第七中学校)
 Asakawa (浅川中学校)
 Bessho (別所中学校)
 Hiyodoriyama (ひよどり山中学校)
 Ishikawa (石川中学校)
 Kamiyugi (上柚木中学校)
 Kasumi (加住中学校)
 Kawaguchi (川口中学校)
 Konobara (甲ノ原中学校)
 Kunigida (椚田中学校)
 Matsugaya (松が谷中学校)
 Matsugi (松木中学校)
 Minamino (みなみ野中学校)
 Minamiosawa (南大沢中学校)
 Miyagami (宮上中学校)
 Moto Hachioji (元八王子中学校)
 Nagabusa (長房中学校)
 Nakayama (中山中学校)
 Nanakuni (七国中学校)
 Narahara (楢原中学校)
 Ongata (恩方中学校)
 Ryonan (陵南中学校)
 Shiroyama (城山中学校)
 Uchikoshi (打越中学校)
 Yarimizu (鑓水中学校)
 Yokokawa (横川中学校)
 Yokoyama (横山中学校)
 Yotsuya (四谷中学校)
 Yugi (由木中学校)
 Yui (由井中学校)

Municipal elementary schools:

 No. 1 (第一小学校)
 No. 2 (第二小学校)
 No. 3 (第三小学校)
 No. 4 (第四小学校)
 No. 5 (第五小学校)
 No. 7 (第七小学校)
 No. 8 (第八小学校)
 No. 9 (第九小学校)
 No. 10 (第十小学校)
 Akibadai (秋葉台小学校)
 Asakawa (浅川小学校)
 Atago (愛宕小学校)
 Bessho (別所小学校)
 Funeda (船田小学校)
 Higashi Asakawa (東浅川小学校)
 Kami Ichibukata (上壱分方小学校)
 Kami Kawaguchi (上川口小学校)
 Kami Yugi (上柚木小学校)
 Kashima (鹿島小学校)
 Kashiwagi (柏木小学校)
 Kasumi (加住小学校)
 Katakuradai (片倉台小学校)
 Kawaguchi (川口小学校)
 Komiya (小宮小学校)
 Kunugida (椚田小学校)
 Nagaike (長池小学校)
 Matsugaya (松が谷小学校)
 Matsugi (松木小学校)
 Midorigaoka (緑が丘小学校)
 Minamino (みなみ野小学校)
 Minamino Kimita (みなみ野君田小学校)
 Minami Osawa (南大沢小学校)
 Miyakami (宮上小学校)
 Miyama (美山小学校)
 Moto Hachioji (元八王子小学校)
 Moto Hachioji Higashi (元八王子東小学校)
 Motoki (元木小学校)
 Nagabusa (長房小学校)
 Naganuma (長沼小学校)
 Nakano Kita (中野北小学校)
 Nakayama (中山小学校)
 Nanakuni (七国小学校)
 Narahara (楢原小学校)
 Matsue (松枝小学校)
 Nibukata (弐分方小学校)
 Ongata No. 1 (恩方第一小学校)
 Ongata No. 2 (恩方第二小学校)
 Owada (大和田小学校)
 Sanda (散田小学校)
 Shimizu (清水小学校)
 Shimo Yugi (下柚木小学校)
 Shiroyama (城山小学校)
 Takakura (高倉小学校)
 Takane (高嶺小学校)
 Toyo (陶鎔小学校)
 Utsukidai (宇津木台小学校)
 Yamada (山田小学校)
 Yarimizu (鑓水小学校)
 Yokokawa (横川小学校)
 Yokoyama No. 1 (横山第一小学校)
 Yokoyama No. 2 (横山第二小学校)
 Yugi Chuo (由木中央小学校)
 Yugi Higashi (由木東小学校)
 Yugi Nishi (由木西小学校)
 Yui No. 1 (由井第一小学校)
 Yui No. 2 (由井第二小学校)
 Yui No. 3 (由井第三小学校)

Former:
 Takaosan Gakuen (高尾山学園) - Elementary and junior high

Transportation

Railways

  JR East - Chūō Main Line
 –  – 
  JR East - Yokohama Line
 –  – 
  JR East - Hachikō Line
 –  – 
 Keio Corporation - Keiō Line 
 –  – 
 Keio Corporation - Keiō Takao Line
  –  –  –  –  –  – 
 Keio Corporation - Sagamihara Line
 – 
 Tokyo Tama Intercity Monorail - Tama Toshi Monorail Line
 –  – 
Takaotozan Railway

Highways

Sister city relations
 Kaohsiung, Taiwan - friendship city since November 1, 2006
 Siheung, Gyeonggi Province, South Korea - friendship city since November 7, 2006
 Tai'an, Shandong, People's Republic of China - friendship city since September 23, 2006

Local attractions 
Hachioji stretches over a large area, combining such diverse parts as the densely populated city center and its shopping district with the hardly populated rural areas in the west.

Mt. Takao (599 m) is a popular hiking destination in the southwest, easily accessible through the Keiō Takao Line. It is famous for the Shingon Buddhist temple . 
Mt. Jinba (855 m) is more difficult to reach, requiring a one-hour bus ride from the city center. It is popular, however, because of the scenic view toward Mt. Fuji.
Tama Forest Science Garden 
Tokyo Fuji Art Museum
Kamiyugi Park Baseball Field
Kamiyugi Park Athletic Stadium
Musashi Imperial Graveyard houses the remains of the Taishō and Shōwa emperors.
Takiyama Castle, A castle ruin in the Sengoku period, one of the Continued Top 100 Japanese Castles. 
Hachiōji Castle, A castle ruin in the Sengoku period, one of the Japan's Top 100 Castles.

References

1964 Summer Olympics official report. Volume 2. Part 1. p. 263.

External links

Hachiōji City Official Website 

Venues of the 1964 Summer Olympics
Cities in Tokyo
Olympic cycling venues
Western Tokyo